Bökönbaev is a village in the Issyk-Kul Region of Kyrgyzstan. It is the seat of the Tong District and of the Kün-Chygysh village community. It was established as Kol'tsovka village in 1912.  With a population of 14,267 (2021), it is the largest village on the south shore of lake Issyk Kul.  Its industry has decayed since Soviet times. It is now a base for tourism into the mountains to the south.  There are demonstrations of falconry with eagles.  The road to the west to Balykchy goes through dry and less-attractive country.

Population

References

Bradt Travel Guides

Populated places in Issyk-Kul Region